Alone with the Blues may refer to:
Alone with the Blues (Ray Bryant album) recorded in 1958
Alone with the Blues (Red Garland album) recorded in 1960